The Regional Research Institute (RRI) at West Virginia University is a university-wide regional science research center for graduate students and faculty members in the fields of economics, resource economics, geography, history and sociology. Professor William H. Miernyk, a regional economist trained at Harvard, came to West Virginia University and founded RRI and served as the 1st Director. Since its opening in 1965, the Regional Research Institute has helped scholars do research. For numerous individuals, both at West Virginia University and elsewhere, it has provided crucial encouragement, stimulation, and opportunities. Its programs involve faculty members, graduate students, and an extensive network of scholars in the United States and abroad.

About 
The Regional Research Institute conducts and promotes interdisciplinary research on the economic and social development of lagging regions. As a center of regional research excellence for more than four decades, the RRI has served as an international recognized center for the advancement of regional science-an interdisciplinary field at the intersection of geography, economics, and planning.

The orientation William H. Miernyk established is at the heart of the Institute today:
 The Regional Research Institute exists for scholarly research. Scholars define the research projects, and scholars evaluate the proposals and results. The overall objective is to increase knowledge through publication of journal articles and books.
 Graduate students are an integral part of the Institute.  As their educations progress, so do their roles on research projects.  They learn research skills, conduct and publish research, and present papers at conferences in the U.S. and worldwide.
 The scope of the Institute extends beyond the economic and social problems of Appalachia to similar regions elsewhere.  It incorporates an enduring focus on quantitative methods for studying regions and evaluating policy directions.
The Institute encourages and nurtures international and multidisciplinary research.  It organizes conferences and seminars, initiates research activities, creates research opportunities abroad, and hosts visiting scholars.

For 50 years, the Regional Research Institute has helped scholars do research. For numerous individuals, both at West Virginia University and elsewhere, it has provided crucial encouragement, stimulation, and opportunities.  Its programs involve faculty members, graduate students, and an extensive network of scholars in the United States and abroad.

Directors 
 William H. Miernyk, 1965–1983
 Robert Saunders, Acting Director, 1969–1970
 Patrick C. Mann, Interim, 1983–1984
 Andrew M. Isserman, 1985–1997
 Brian J. Cushing, Acting Director, 1991
 Luc Anselin, Interim Director, 1997–1998
 Scott Loveridge, 1999–2000
 Ronald L. Lewis, Interim Director, 2000–2001
 Randall W. Jackson, Director, 2001-

Research Assistant Professors

Two faculty positions were created at the RRI in 1985.  They are non-tenure track, two-to-three year appointments for recent Ph.D.s capable of becoming leading scholars.  The research assistant professors conduct their own research, participate in joining research projects, and generally teach one course per year.

 Paul M. Beaumont, 1985-1987
 Robert Walker, 1985-1987
 Mary Beth Pudup, 1986-1989
 PhilipShapira, 1988-1990
 Carla Dickstein, 1988-1990
 Stephen Fournier, 1991-1993
 Terance Rephann, 1993-1994
 Stephan Weiler, 1994-1996
 Cynthia Rogers, 1994-1997
 Emily Talen, 1995-1998
 Attila Varga, 1997-1998
 Oleg Smirnov, 1998
 Ge Lin, 2000-2005
 Shaoming Cheng, 2006-2008
 Randall Rosenberger, 2000-2002
 Gianfranco Piras, 2010-2014

Research Associates
One faculty-equivalent position was created in 2005. These individuals are non-tenure track, three-year appointments for more senior 
Ph.D. researchers capable of becoming leading scholars.  The research associates conduct their own research, participate in RRI research projects, and contribute to instruction by committee participation, teaching course modules, and presenting guest lectures and seminars.

Hodjat Ghadimi, 2005-2010

Research Associate Professor
This is a tenured, joint position; 50 percent of the appointment is with the RRI, 25 percent of the appointment is with Agricultural and Resource Economics and 25 percent of the appointment is with Economics.

Donald J. Lacombe, 2010-

Web Book of Regional Science 
The Web Book of Regional Science was initiated in 2001–present. It brings together on one website comprehensive descriptions of many of the basic concepts, analytical tools and policy issues important to regional science. Selective publications are listed below:

Classics in Regional Science
 An Introduction to Regional Economics, Edgar M. Hoover and Frank Giarratani
 The 1975 West Virginia Input-Output Study: Modeling a Regional Economy, Anthony L.Loviscek, Randy E. Holliday, Lucinda A. Robinson, and Melissa A Wolford
 Elements of Input-Output Analysis, William H. Miernyk
 Optimal Location of Facilities, Gerard Rushton
 Scientific Geography Series, Grant Ian Thrall, editor
 Land Use and Urban Form, Grant Ian Thrall

Methods or Empirically Oriented Contributions
 Analysis of Land Use Change: Theoretical and Modeling Approaches, Helen Briassoulis
 Computable General Equilibrium Modeling for Regional Analysis, Eliécer E. Vargas, Dean F. Schreiner, Gelson Tembo, and David W. Marcouiller
 Industrial and Regional Clusters: Concepts and Comparative Applications, Edward M. Bergman and Edward J. Feser
 An Introduction to State and Local Public Finance, Thomas A. Garrett and John C. Weatherman
 Keystone Sector Identification: A Graph Theory-Social Network Analysis Approach, Maureen Kilkenny and Laura Nalbarte
 Migration and Local Labor Markets, Stephan J.Goetz
 Regions in Changing Economic Environment, Gennadi Kazakevitch and Sharn Enzinger
 Regional Impact Models, William Schaffer
 Spatial Econometrics, James LeSage

Policy or Practice Oriented Contributions
 Community Preparedness for Site Development, William Grunkemeyer, Myra Moss, and Jerold R. Thomas
 The Geography of the New Economy, R. D. Norton
 Key Concepts in Sustainable Development, William Grunkemeyer and Myra Moss
 Regional Governance, Institutions and Development, Mike Danson and Geoff Whittam
 Site Planning and Design, Steven B. McBride
 Poverty, Inequality and Social Justice in Nonmetropolitan America, Don Albrecht

Sources 
 Regional Research Institute
 Regional Research Institute Timeline from 1965-2010 RRI Timeline Updated May-2015

References 

Economic research institutes
West Virginia University
1965 establishments in West Virginia